Leanne Caret (born 18 November 1966) is an American businesswoman, former president and CEO of Boeing Defense, Space & Security (BDS), former executive vice president of Boeing, and serves on the United Service Organizations (USO) board of governors.

Education 
Caret received her bachelor's degree in business administration from Kansas State University and a Master of Business Administration (MBA) from Wichita State University.

Career 
In 1988, Caret began her career with Boeing and has held various program management positions in the defense business. Later, she became vice president and general manager of Vertical Lift within BDS. She served as chief financial officer and vice president of BDS, and then the presidency of Boeing Global Services and Support, which she held until assuming her current role as President and CEO of BDS in February 2016.

In 2018, Caret was included in Fortune's Most Powerful Women list for the second consecutive year.

In 2022, Caret retired as president of BDS.

References

External links

Living people
American women chief executives
Kansas State University alumni
Wichita State University alumni
Boeing people
1966 births
20th-century American businesspeople
21st-century American businesspeople
21st-century American businesswomen
20th-century American businesswomen